The Turkish State Railways (TCDD) 2201 Class was a class of 0-4-0ST steam locomotives.

They were built by Sharp, Stewart and Company of Manchester, England for the Ottoman Railway Company and were taken over by TCDD later.  The 4 locomotives in this class were numbered 36–39, later 2201–2204.  The first arrived in 1889. At least two, 2201 & 2204, were still in service in 1955 and 2202 was reported to be scrapped in 1956.

References 

0-4-0ST locomotives
2201
Steam locomotives of Turkey
Sharp Stewart locomotives
Standard gauge locomotives of Turkey
Railway locomotives introduced in 1889